Kings of the Sun (also abbreviated K.O.T.S.) is an Australian hard rock band formed by Jeffrey Hoad and Clifford Hoad in Sydney in 1986.

Career

1982–1985: The Young Lions
The Young Lions was formed  by guitarist Bob Spencer (Finch, Skyhooks). The band included drummer Clifford Hoad, Hoad's younger brother Jeffrey, who took lead vocals & guitar duties, and bass player Marlon Holden. They scored support slots for The Angels and INXS the same year.

The band dissolved around 1986 after Spencer left to join The Angels and the Hoad brothers formed "Kings of the Sun" with Ron Thiessen (guitar), Anthony Ragg (bass) They were named after the Yul Brynner film of the same name.

1986–1998: Kings of the Sun (1986–1998)
In 1986 the band was signed to Mushroom Records, where they recorded their first single. During this time both Tommy Poulter and John McKinnon left the band and Anthony Ragg was brought in to take McKinnon's place. Their debut single, "Bottom of My Heart", was released in 1986 with "Bad Love" as its B-side. After its release "Bottom of My Heart" charted on the Kent Music Report. 

The band was signed to RCA Records after the RCA executive Simon Lowe saw them perform in Sydney and the band traveled to New York City to work on their first album. Bandmate Ron Thiessen did not accompany them, as he left prior to the band being signed, and he was replaced by Anthony Ragg.

In 1988 the band released their self-titled debut album Kings of the Sun, which was produced by Eddie Kramer and mixed by Dave Thoener. The album's lead single  "Serpentine", peaked at number 48 in Australia.

After the album released Glenn Morris joined the band to play lead guitar and the group toured the United States and Europe. They returned to Australia in 1988 to open for Guns N' Roses, but were kicked out of the tour after Clifford Hoad "dropped his pants in front of the audience and bad-mouthed Guns N' Roses publicly". There had also been tension due to a remark Hoad made in an interview for the Australian On the Street magazine, where he claimed that Guns N' Roses took much of their image from Rose Tattoo. 

Years later Hoad responded to this by stating "When I said those things, I meant them. It wasn’t necessarily aimed at Guns N’Roses. It was aimed at the Australian press and public. ‘OK, make a fuss over Guns N’Roses but at least know that Rose Tattoo exists."

More lineup changes occurred in 1986 after Morris left the band to  join The Screaming Tribesmen, although he rejoined KOTS before the band released their second album, Full Frontal Attack in 1990.

The band's second album, Full Frontal Attack was released in August 1990 and was produced by William Wittman. Dave Thoener returned to mix the album. Full Frontal Attack was the last album the band released through RCA Records and Morris and Ragg left the band in 1992.

The band's third album Resurrection was released in 1993 through Mushroom Records. It was recorded at A&M Studios and Paramount Studios and was mastered at Precision Mastering. Phil Soussan (Ozzy Osbourne) played on all the tracks on the record with the exception of "Fuzz", which Brad Spurr contributed, and Spurr joined the band after its release.

Kings Of The Sun self-produced the album except for two tracks by mixer Mark Dearnley, "First Thing About Rock'n'Roll (I Remember)" and "Fuzz". Two singles were released from the album, "Trapped Inside Your Heart" and "Road to Nowhere", and the band supported Jimmy Barnes on his Australian tour during 1993.

Spurr left the band around 1995 and was replaced by Dean Turner on bass.

The band recorded an album Daddy Was A Hobo Man in 1997, but it was not released until 2011, when it was made available as an independent release. Of the album, Clifford Hoad stated that they did not want to release an album similar to their prior releases and that "This album, we wanted to record with no commercial pressure what so ever, also, at the time we wanted to record as a 3 piece and live in the studio, this is what you’re hearing."

In 1998 the band supported Sammy Hagar's Australian tour. Kings of the Sun officially disbanded in 2001.

Clifford Hoad and Jeffrey Hoad ceased working together in 2009 and continue to be estranged.

2010–present: Clifford Hoad's Kings of the Sun  

In 2010 Clifford Hoad began with the composition of songs for the new album and formation of a new Kings of the Sun lineup – this time without his younger brother Jeffrey.

In March 2013, new KOTS lineup entered Govinda Doyle’s private studio to record Cliff Hoad’s latest compositions. Quentin Elliott returned to play lead guitar and Dave Talon (Rollerball) joined on rhythm guitar. Drummer Cliff Hoad also took charge of singing, as he sang backing vocals on all previous albums and lead vocals on 2 tracks (shared with Jeff on Shot Me an Arrow & lead on I Wanna Rock). Bass tracks were recorded by Govinda Doyle who also engineered and produced the album with co-production by Clifford Hoad. Mixing was done by Govinda & Clifford.

New album entitled Rock Til Ya Die was released on 5 September 2013 via band's website and is return to classic Australian rock sound. 5 promo videos were shot by Dan Jensen and Trudy Martin of Darklight Studios, combining music clip with documentary style interviews with Cliff Hoad, who tells a story behind each song.

Clifford Hoad has released his 9th album called Razed on Rock on 20 October 2016 and the most recent one called Playin' to the Heavens on 28 May 2017. Hoad again played double duty as lead vocalist and drummer.

Personnel

Current members 
Clifford Hoad - lead vocals, drums & percussions

Past members 
Jeffrey Hoad - lead vocals, guitars
Anthony Ragg - bass
Rowie Riot - lead guitar
Shar Roxxon - rhythm guitar, keyboards & backing vocals
Laurie Marlow - bass & backing vocals
Quentin Elliott - lead guitar
Dave Talon - rhythm guitar
Baron von Berg - 2nd drums
Darren Marlow - bass & backing vocals
Glenn Morris - lead guitar
Chris Lewis - bass
Dean Turner - bass
Brad Spurr - bass
Ron Thiessen - lead guitar
Tommy Poulter - lead guitar
John McKinnon - bass
Marlon Holden - bass
Bob Spencer - lead guitar

Session musicians 
Gary Lee - bass *Full Frontal Attack album recording
Phil Soussan - bass *Resurrection album recording
Govinda Doyle - bass *Rock Til Ya Die album recording
Craig Pesco - bass *KISS concert at Carrara Stadium in 2001

Discography

Studio albums

Singles

Awards and nominations

Countdown Australian Music Awards
Countdown was an Australian pop music TV series on national broadcaster ABC-TV from 1974–1987, it presented music awards from 1979–1987, initially in conjunction with magazine TV Week. The TV Week / Countdown Awards were a combination of popular-voted and peer-voted awards.

|-
| 1986
| themselves 
| Most Promising New Talent
| 
|-

References

External links 
Kings of the Sun Discography
The Rich and Famous Discography
Clifford Hoad's Kings of the Sun - official FB page
2015 Jeff Hoad Interview - Australian Rock Show Podcast
2017 Clifford Hoad Interview - Australian Rock Show Podcast

Australian rock music groups
Australian hard rock musical groups